Empire State Pullers, known to many of its pullers as ESP, is a truck and tractor pulling sanctioning body. It conducts pulls at circuits throughout New York State. ESP began sanctioning events in the Lucas Oil owned Pro Pulling League in 2007.

Classes
At every pull, different classes of tractors pull.  Each class includes a different style of tractor or truck chassis. The tractors use 6000 horsepower motors. The different classes include:
2WD - Two Wheel Drive Trucks
MOD - Modified Tractors
SFS - Super Farm 
HSS - Heavy Super Stock
LSS - Light Super Stock

Champions

References

External links
 Empire State Pullers Official Website

Tractor pulling